Euides speciosa is a species of true bug belonging to the family Delphacidae.

It is native to Europe.

References

Delphacidae